Michael John "Mile" Jedinak (born 3 August 1984) is an Australian former professional footballer who served as the captain of the Australia national team. He is currently the Loan Player Development Coach at Aston Villa.

Jedinak was born and raised in Sydney, and played youth football with Sydney United before starting his senior career at the club. Following loan spells at Varteks and South Coast United, Jedinak moved to Central Coast Mariners in 2006. He next played in Turkey, for Gençlerbirliği and Antalyaspor on loan before joining Crystal Palace and subsequently playing a role in the club earning promotion to the Premier League. In 2016, he joined Aston Villa, where he played until 2019, helping them achieve promotion back to the Premier League, before retiring and later transitioning into a coaching role there.

Jedinak made 79 appearances for the Australian national team from 2008 to 2018, and was Captain over 25 times since 2014. This includes participation in the 2010, 2014 and 2018 FIFA World Cups. He has also played at two AFC Asian Cups, including captaining Australia to victory on home soil in the 2015 edition.

Club career
Jedinak began playing when he was chosen to be part of the PDSSSC – a competition between Catholic schools within the Parramatta Diocesan – where he played for St Agnes Catholic High, the same school compatriot Željko Kalac attended. He also played for Loyola Senior High School, Mount Druitt in the Jesuit Cup. As captain, Jedinak led the team to success, winning the competition. He began his career at Sydney United, and spent some time in the early years of his career at Croatian club Varteks (later renamed Varaždin), making one competitive appearance for the Croatian side in a 2003–04 UEFA Cup qualifier against Levadia Maardu. He was part of the Sydney United side that won the NSW Premier League title for 2006, playing a role in midfield that earned him a trial with the Mariners.

Central Coast Mariners

Jedinak was first added to the Mariners' squad in the week leading up to their 2006 Pre-Season Cup play-off against Newcastle Jets, and subsequently was called into the squad for the last ten games of the 2006–07, where he made eight appearances.

Jedinak achieved success at the Central Coast Mariners, helping them to a Premiers' Plate in the 2007–08 season of the A-League and scoring some spectacular goals along the way including a 25-metre free-kick in the 5–4 loss in Round 15 to Sydney FC. He was the club's second highest goalscorer in the 2008–09 season, with six goals.

Gençlerbirliği
On 25 December 2008, Jedinak signed a two-and-a-half-year deal with Turkish club Gençlerbirliği effective January 2009.

On 24 January 2009, he made his competitive debut for Gençlerbirliği in their 3–1 victory over Kayserispor, playing the full match. Jedinak's first goal for Gençlerbirliği was scored in a 1–0 win over Fenerbahçe.

Crystal Palace

With one year remaining on his contract at Gençlerbirliği, Jedinak announced he was leaving the club in June 2011, with the hopes of finding a new club in a different country. A month later, he signed for Crystal Palace in England. Jedinak became a fans' favourite at Selhurst Park during the 2012–13 season. In light of regular club captain Paddy McCarthy's injury spell that season, Jedinak was handed the captain's armband first by manager Dougie Freedman and later by Ian Holloway. Jedinak scored an 89th-minute winner on the final day of the 2012–13 season in a 3–2 win against Peterborough United at Selhurst Park to secure a playoff place for Palace, then captained Palace to win the playoffs and gain promotion to the top-flight Premier League. Jedinak was voted Crystal Palace's 2012–13 player of the season.

On 3 December 2013, Jedinak signed a new three-and-a-half year contract which was set to expire in the summer of 2017. He scored his first Premier League goal from a penalty kick against West Ham United in April 2014, choosing not to celebrate the goal to pay respect for compatriot Dylan Tombides, who was being honoured that match following his death. Jedinak came close to playing every minute of Palace's 2013–14 Premier League season (a rarity for an outfield player, even captains), but injured himself in the second half of the 2–2 draw with Fulham; he was replaced by Kagisho Dikgacoi with just over 30 minutes left to play.

On 28 October 2014, Jedinak was named the fifth-best player in Europe, the best midfielder in Europe and the best player in the Premier League after the first three months of the 2014–15 season by the website Oulala Fantasy Football based on Opta performance statistics, an accolade he brushed off as reported by Australian broadcaster Special Broadcasting Service. On 30 November, he was named as Asian International Footballer of the Year. Jedinak's superb freekick in a 3–1 win over Liverpool in November 2014 was voted Goal of the Season at the 2015 Crystal Palace FC Awards night.

Prior to the 2016–17 Premier League season, the club announced that Jedinak had resigned the captaincy and that Scott Dann would succeed him.

Aston Villa
New Aston Villa owner Tony Xia tweeted via his own Twitter account 'We'll officially announce one new signing at 5PM today' on 17 August 2016, in which it was later confirmed by the club at 5pm that Jedinak was Villa's latest acquisition and that he moved to the Championship club on a three-year deal. He made his debut for Aston Villa on 27 August 2016 in a 3–1 loss to Bristol City.

On 23 December 2017, Jedinak scored his first Villa goal in a 2–2 home draw with Sheffield United. The following 12 May, he headed the only goal of a play-off semi-final win at Middlesbrough. Two weeks later, in the final at Wembley, Villa lost 1–0 to Fulham, and Jedinak was substituted for the more attacking Josh Onomah with 13 minutes remaining.

On 14 May 2019 Jedinak came off the bench deep into extra time during Villa's playoff semi-final victory over Midlands rivals West Bromwich Albion. A specialist penalty taker with a 100% career record, Jedinak scored to put Aston Villa 2-0 ahead in the penalty shoot-out with Villa eventually running out 4-3 winners. He was an unused substitute two weeks later on 27 May as Aston Villa beat Derby County 2-1 at Wembley to secure a return to the Premier league.   

Jedinak was released by Aston Villa at the end of the 2018–19 season.

In May 2020, Jedinak stated that he had not yet retired from professional football and was still open to playing however, in July 2020 announced his retirement from professional football.

International career

Jedinak played at the 2003 FIFA World Youth Championship in the United Arab Emirates, making appearances against the Czech Republic, Canada and the host nation.

Jedinak made his full international debut in a friendly against Singapore in early 2008 and was an integral squad member of Pim Verbeek's "Socceroos" in the lead up to the 2010 FIFA World Cup. Jedinak was included in Australia's 23-man squad for the 2010 World Cup and made his first appearance in Australia's opening match against Germany on 13 June. This, however, would be Jedinak's only involvement in the competition.

Jedinak scored his first international goal against South Korea at 2011 AFC Asian Cup. He went on to score his second international goal in the following match of the tournament against Bahrain.

In the absence of incumbent captain Lucas Neill, Jedinak was handed the captaincy for Australia's 3–4 friendly loss to Ecuador.

On 21 May 2014, Socceroos coach Ange Postecoglou appointed Jedinak as captain of the Australian national team to compete in the 2014 FIFA World Cup in Brazil, despite suffering an injury when playing in Crystal Palace's final match of the Premier League season. On 18 June, Jedinak scored from the penalty spot in Australia's 3–2 group stage defeat to the Netherlands in Porto Alegre.

Jedinak was named as captain of Australia for the 2015 AFC Asian Cup on home soil. He started in their first group game against Kuwait, scoring a penalty in the 62nd minute a 4–1 victory, but finished the game with an ankle injury. He returned to action in the knockout stages, and eventually lifted the trophy after the win over South Korea in the final.

After initially being named in Australia's squad for the 2017 FIFA Confederations Cup, Jedinak was later ruled out due to a groin strain aggravated in Australia's World Cup qualifier win against Saudi Arabia. He was replaced in the squad by James Jeggo. On 15 November 2017, Jedinak scored a hat-trick against Honduras to qualify Australia for the 2018 FIFA World Cup.

In May 2018 he was named in Australia’s 23-man squad for the 2018 World Cup in Russia. On 16 June, he scored a penalty during a 2–1 defeat against France in Australia's opening match of the tournament, his second goal in a World Cup after scoring against the Netherlands in 2014. Jedinak scored another penalty against Denmark in the second group match on 21 June 2018, equalizing the match and helping Australia get a point. 

Jedinak retired from international football in October 2018. His 79 caps made him the ninth-most capped player for the country, and his 20 goals put him seventh amongst their all-time goalscorers.

Coaching career
In March 2020, Jedinak was appointed to a coaching role with Aston Villa's academy. On 30 March 2021, he was appointed as Loan Development Coach at Aston Villa.

Personal life
Jedinak is married to Natalie Peacock and they have four children (boys).

As well as the name "Mile", a hypocorism of his given name, Michael, he is also colloquially known as "Jedi", shortened from "Jedinak". Due to that name's similarity to the group of Star Wars characters known as Jedi, he is often told "May the force be with you" and to "Use the force".

Career statistics

Club

International

International goals

Scores and results list Australia's goal tally first.

Honours
Sydney United
NSW Premier League: 2006

Central Coast Mariners
A-League Premiership: 2007–08

Crystal Palace
Football League Championship play-offs: 2013
FA Cup runner-up: 2015–16

Aston Villa
EFL Championship play-offs: 2019

Australia
AFC Asian Cup: 2015

Individual
Mariners Medal: 2007–08
PFA A-League Team of the Season: 2008–09
Crystal Palace Player of the Year: 2012–13
FFA Male footballer of the Year: 2013, 2014
Asian International Footballer of the Year: 2014
PFA Footballer of the Year: 2013–14
AFC Opta All-time World Cup XI: 2020
IFFHS Asian Men's Team of All Time: 2021

References

External links

Gençlerbirliği profile
Central Coast Mariners profile
FFA – Socceroo profile
Oz Football profile
Profile at TFF.org
Crystal Palace profile

1984 births
Australian people of Croatian descent
Australia under-20 international soccer players
Australia international soccer players
Australia youth international soccer players
Süper Lig players
A-League Men players
National Soccer League (Australia) players
English Football League players
Premier League players
Antalyaspor footballers
Central Coast Mariners FC players
Crystal Palace F.C. players
Gençlerbirliği S.K. footballers
NK Varaždin players
Sydney United 58 FC players
South Coast United players
Aston Villa F.C. players
2010 FIFA World Cup players
2011 AFC Asian Cup players
2014 FIFA World Cup players
2015 AFC Asian Cup players
Australian expatriate soccer players
Australian expatriate sportspeople in Croatia
Australian expatriate sportspeople in England
Australian expatriate sportspeople in Turkey
Expatriate footballers in Croatia
Expatriate footballers in England
Expatriate footballers in Turkey
Aston Villa F.C. non-playing staff
Soccer players from Sydney
Living people
AFC Asian Cup-winning players
Association football midfielders
2018 FIFA World Cup players
Australian soccer players
FA Cup Final players
Association football coaches